Sherwin Skeete (born 31 October 1994) is a Guyanese footballer. He is a right back who has played for the Guyana national football team.

References

Guyanese footballers
Guyana international footballers
Living people
1994 births
Place of birth missing (living people)
Association footballers not categorized by position
21st-century Guyanese people